San Giacomo alla Lungara is a church in Rome (Italy), in the Rione Trastevere, facing on Via della Lungara. It is also called San Giacomo in Settimiano or in Settignano, due to its vicinity to Porta Settimiana, built by Septimius Severus and included by Aurelianus within the city walls.

The church has medieval origins: it probably dates back to the papacy of Leo IV in 9th century. However, the former documents attesting its existence are papal bulls promulgated in 1198 and 1228, when the church was declared a branch of St. Peter's Basilica by Pope Innocent III. In 12th century Pope Innocent IV allowed it to the Sylvestrine Congregation; in 1620 the Vatican Chapter entrusted the church to the Franciscans and then to the Penitent Nuns, which, in 1644, charged Luigi Arrigucci (1575–1644) with the restoration of the building: because of these restorations, the church lost its basilican layout with three naves and became a single nave church with coffering on the ceiling. In the same period the nuns also built the annexed cloister, devoted to the prostitutes wishing to change their life; the cloister was demolished in 1887, during the building of the Lungotevere. In the same period the church, after having suffered 15 years of abandon and risked itself the destruction, was finally renovated.

Across the Lungotevere it is possible to see the Romanesque towerbell, dating back to the 12th century and the only surviving Medieval feature. 
The interior of the church displays a single nave. The most famous work of art is the Memorial to Ippolito Merenda by Gian Lorenzo Bernini: a gravestone with the shape of a puckered sheet, sustained with both hands and teeth by a winged skeleton. The high altar houses a painting by Giovanni Francesco Romanelli portraying James the Apostle.

Bibliography 
 
 
 
 
 

Giacomo alla Lungara
Baroque architecture in Rome
Romanesque architecture in Lazio
Roman Catholic churches in Rome
Churches of Rome (rione Trastevere)